Beerpur is a large village located in Mohammadabad tehsil in Ghazipur district of Uttar Pradesh. It is located on the bank of river Ganges. It has total 1348 families residing. The Beerpur village has population of 9377 as per Population Census 2011.

Administration
Beerpur is administered by Pradhan through its Gram Panchayat as per the constitution of India and Panchayati Raj act.

Nearby places
Ghazipur
Kundesar
Varanasi
Mughalsarai
Buxar

Notable people
Tikam Deo : Tikam Deo war Chero ruler who had his fort at Birpur in Twelfth Century. He was defeated by Mulhan Dikshit.  
Atul Rai : Atul Rai is Member of Parliament from Ghosi (Lok Sabha constituency).
Pawan Kumar Rai*[Ex Village president] and brother of Atul Rai

References

External links
Villages in Ghazipur  Uttar Pradesh

Villages in Ghazipur district